Sunna is an alternative spelling of sunnah, a set of traditional customs and practices associated with the Islamic prophet Muhammad and other early Muslim figures.

It may also refer to:

 Sunna (band), a British rock band
 Sunna (Saxon chief), a Saxon chief
 Sunna Davíðsdóttir (born 1985), Icelandic mixed martial artist
 Kim Sunna (born 1987), Swedish professional ice hockey player
 Sunna, a Germanic personification of the sun related to the Norse Sól
 Sunna, an Arian bishop of Merida
 Sunnah, alias used by Australian rapper of the group Lgeez

See also
Sunne (disambiguation)
Sunni, a branch of Islam